Seán Yap Sei-Been Devlin (叶 世民) is a Canadian comedian and writer based in Vancouver, British Columbia. He is most noted for his 2018 film When the Storm Fades, for which he won the Emerging Canadian Director award at the 2018 Vancouver International Film Festival, and his 2021 comedy album Airports, Animals, for which he was a Juno Award nominee for Comedy Album of the Year at the Juno Awards of 2022.

He was previously known as the creator of Shit Harper Did, a satirical website critical of the government of Stephen Harper, in the early 2010s.

Airports, Animals was released by Arts & Crafts Productions in 2021 as the label's first-ever comedy album.

References

1983 births
Living people
21st-century Canadian screenwriters
21st-century Canadian male writers
21st-century Canadian comedians
Canadian male screenwriters
Canadian male comedians
Canadian stand-up comedians
Canadian people of Filipino descent
Comedians from Vancouver
Film directors from Vancouver
Writers from Vancouver
Arts & Crafts Productions artists
Asian-Canadian filmmakers